The 2011 Hungarian GP2 round was a GP2 Series motor race held on July 30 and 31, 2011 at Hungaroring, Hungary. It was the seventh round of the 2011 GP2 season. The race supported the 2011 Hungarian Grand Prix.

Classification

Qualifying

Notes
 – Valsecchi was given a ten place grid penalty for Feature Race after causing a collision during Nürburgring Sprint Race and also a three place penalty for impeding Grosjean during the qualifying session.
 – Carroll was handed a three place grid penalty for impeding Coletti during the qualifying session.

Feature Race

Sprint Race

Notes
 – Ericsson was given a twenty-second penalty after the race.

Standings after the round

Drivers' Championship standings

Teams' Championship standings

 Note: Only the top five positions are included for both sets of standings.

See also 
 2011 Hungarian Grand Prix
 2011 Hungaroring GP3 Series round

References

External links
GP2 Series official website: Results

Hungarian
GP2